Gabriele Castagnola (14 November 1828 – 30 August 1883) was an Italian artist born in Genoa and active in Florence. He worked in oil painting and chromolithography in an academic style. This style of painting and sculpture derived from the Academies where most artists received their formal training, and is characterized by its high finish, use of mythological or historical subject matter, and moralistic tone. Castagnola's paintings are often somewhat sentimental and often focus on themes of love and romance. The romance of the Early Renaissance painter Filippo Lippi with the young novice Lucrezia Buti is a recurring theme in his pieces, as are nuns in general.

His works include: Filippo Lippi e Lucrezia Buti (1863), Scena Romantica (1864), Ciociara, Jeune Fille au Balcon (1865), Faust and Marguerite (1870), Lippi Declaring his Love to the Nun/Lippi with the Nun (1870),  Filippino Lippi and his Mistress (1871), Love or Duty (1871), A Nun Observing Two Butterflies (1872), Reading Together (1872), Rosen (1873), Scena Galante, Couple Romantique Assis Sur un Banc (1873), The Embrace of Fra Filippo Lippi and Lucrezia Buti (1874), The Meeting (1875), Nun Admiring Lovebirds (1875), La Monaca e il Pittore, Amor Cortese  (1876), The Kind Gesture (1876), and The Seduction (1877).

Castagnola died in 1883 in Florence.

Notes 

 Franco Dioli, Repertorio illustrato dei pittori, degli scultori e dei ceramisti liguri tra '800 e '900 a cura di IDAL800900 Istututo Documentazione Arte Ligure dell'Ottocento e Novecento, De Ferrari Editore, Genova, 2014 (ad vocem)
www.pittoriliguri.info a cura di IDAL800900 Istituto Documentazione Arte Ligure dell'Ottocento e Novecento di Franco Dioli

19th-century Italian painters
Italian male painters
1828 births
1883 deaths
Painters from Tuscany
19th-century Italian male artists